The men's high jump at the 2019 Asian Athletics Championships was held on 22 and 24 April.

Medalists

Results

Qualification
Qualification rule:  Qualifying performance 2.22 (Q) or at least 12 best performers (q) qualify for the final

Final

References

High
High jump at the Asian Athletics Championships